The K-Town Historic District is a historic district listed on the National Register of Historic Places located in the North Lawndale community area in Chicago, Illinois. A mainly residential area, its borders are West Cullerton Street to the north, South Pulaski Road to the east, West Cermak Road to the south, and South Kostner Avenue to the west.

History
The larger K-Town area received its name in 1889 when the City of Chicago created an alphabetical naming scheme to assist in mapping a significant amount of newly annexed territory. The streets with names starting with K were eleven miles from the state line between Illinois and Indiana. The larger K-Town area was originally settled by Czech immigrants to the United States at the beginning of the twentieth century. During the Great Migration the North Lawndale area, and subsequently K-Town, became predominantly African American.

The area was added to the NRHP in 2010.

Transportation
The Pulaski and Kostner stations on Chicago Transit Authority's Pink Line are located in the K-Town Historic District.

References

African-American history in Chicago
Czech-American culture in Chicago
North Lawndale, Chicago
Residential buildings on the National Register of Historic Places in Chicago
Historic districts on the National Register of Historic Places in Illinois
Historic districts in Chicago